Pete on the Way to Heaven (translit. Petia po doroge v tsarstvie nebesnoye) is a 2009 Russian drama film directed by Nikolai Dostal. It won the Golden George at the 31st Moscow International Film Festival.

Cast
 Egor Pavlov as Peter Makarov
 Aleksandr Korshunov as Konovalov
 Roman Madyanov as Colonel Boguslavsky
 Svetlana Timofeeva-Letunovskaya as Colonel's wife
 Evgeniy Redko as Surgeon Yoffe
 Svetlana Ulybina as Peter's mother
 Nikolay Machulskiy as Captain Yarkin

References

External links
 

2009 films
2009 drama films
Russian drama films
2000s Russian-language films
Works about the Gulag
Films set in Murmansk Oblast
Films set in 1953